The 1991 Midland Group Championships was a women's tennis tournament played on indoor carpet courts at the Brighton Centre in Brighton, England that was part of the Tier II of the 1991 WTA Tour. It was the 14th edition of the tournament and was held from 22 October until 27 October 1991. First-seeded Steffi Graf won the singles title, her fourth consecutive at the event and fifth in total, and earned $70,000 first-prize money.

Finals

Singles
 Steffi Graf defeated  Zina Garrison 5–7, 6–4, 6–1
 It was Graf's 7th singles title of the year and the 61st of her career.

Doubles
 Pam Shriver /  Natasha Zvereva defeated  Zina Garrison /  Lori McNeil 6–1, 6–2

References

External links
 International Tennis Federation (ITF) tournament event details
 Tournament draws

Midland Bank Tennis Championships
Brighton International
Midland Bank Tennis Championships
Midland Bank Tennis Championships
Brighton
Bright